Chimera is an EP by Marié Digby. It was released on August 16, 2014.

Overview
"Vanish in the Air"  is the single of Marie Digby's EP Chimera. This EP was first featured at iTunes Store.

The EP contains three new Marié Digby songs. This EP is a distinct departure from the acoustic guitar-driven songs of before; here, Digby focuses on creating a pastiche of electronic instruments over which to sing.

Track listing

"Vanish In The Air"

"Vanish in the Air", the single from this EP, uses metallophone-like sounds in order to evoke a Southeast Asian feel. This music video reflects this feeling.

References

2014 EPs
Marié Digby albums